The following  is a list of Inghamite chapels, churches and meeting houses built by followers of Benjamin Ingham, an evangelist from Ossett, Yorkshire.

In the middle of the 18th century, Ingham founded a number of Non-conformist Christian societies, chiefly in the Pennine areas of Lancashire and Yorkshire. These 'societies' formed the basis of local congregations which met in chapels as their place of worship. Less commonly some are referred to as churches, or meeting houses. Many of these chapels were funded and built new for this purpose by benefactors in the Inghamite societies. At the height of their popularity around 100 Inghamite Chapels are believed to have existed, including one in Ontario, Canada.

Following the death of their founder, congregations gradually declined: the number of active chapels had reduced to 16 chapels in 1814, seven chapels in 1918, and only two (Wheatley Lane and Salterforth) survived into the 21st century. In 2019, only Wheatley Lane remained open. The church in Ontario survives, but no longer calls itself Inghamite.

The following list is based chiefly on that given in a 1958 book by Robert Walker Thomson, which in turn quotes from an older source. Supporting information is also drawn from P.J.Oates' book. Chapels and meeting houses which had closed before 1813 are not included.

References 

Inghamite chapels, List Of
Chapels in England
Chapels in Canada
Inghamite